D103 is a state road branching off from D102 state road connecting it to Rijeka Airport. The road is 1.7 km long.

The road, as well as all other state roads in Croatia, is managed and maintained by Hrvatske ceste, a state-owned company.

Road junctions

See also
 Hrvatske ceste
 Rijeka Airport

Sources

State roads in Croatia
Transport in Primorje-Gorski Kotar County